NADPH oxidase 1 is an enzyme that in humans is encoded by the NOX1 gene.

NOX1 is a homolog of the catalytic subunit of the superoxide-generating NADPH oxidase of phagocytes, gp91phox. Two transcript variants encoding different isoforms have been found for this gene.

References

Further reading